The National Scrabble Association (NSA) was created in 1978 by Selchow & Righter, then the makers of Scrabble, to promote their game. It coordinated local clubs and Scrabble tournaments in North America, including the National Scrabble Championship, until 2009. The last director was John D. Williams, who is co-author of the book Everything Scrabble.

In July 2009, the coordination of tournaments and competitive clubs was transferred to a new organization, North American Scrabble Players Association (NASPA), now known as NASPA Games. The NSA continued to publish Scrabble News and run programs such as the School Scrabble program.

The National Scrabble Association dissolved on July 1, 2013.

Activities of the association included:

 Organizing and promoting the National Scrabble Championship (through 2008)
 Playing an active role in Scrabble public relations, publicity and promotions
 Developing and promoting the National School Scrabble Program
 Developing and managing the ProLiteracy Worldwide Fund-Raiser Program
 Publishing 8 issues of Scrabble News each year
 Answering questions from consumers and press regarding the game's history, rules, products, etc.
 Advising Hasbro on word games
 Monitoring the media for correct trademark use
 Co-ordinating casual Scrabble clubs

References

External links
National Scrabble Association (archive)
NASPA Games

Scrabble organizations